Vitrai-sous-Laigle (literally Vitrai under Laigle) is a commune in the Orne department in north-western France.

It is located 70 km north west of Chartres and 53 km south west of Evreux. It takes its name from the town of l'Aigle, 8 km to the north west.

See also
Communes of the Orne department

References

Vitraisouslaigle